Nyctoporis is a genus of darkling beetles in the family Tenebrionidae. There are about five described species in Nyctoporis, found in North America.

Species
These species belong to the genus Nyctoporis:
 Nyctoporis aequicollis Eschscholtz, 1831
 Nyctoporis carinata LeConte 1851
 Nyctoporis cristata Eschscholtz, 1831
 Nyctoporis sponsa Casey, 1907
 Nyctoporis vandykei Blaisdell, 1931

References

Tenebrionoidea